Guangdong Pharmaceutical University (GDPU) is a public university based in Guangzhou, Guangdong Province, China, which offers courses in pharmaceutical sciences.

History 
The university was established in 1958 as the Guangdong provincial health department's advanced studies college. In 1978, with the approval from the Chinese central government, the college became the Guangdong Medical and Pharmaceutical College which offered undergraduate courses. In 1994, the university was restructured as “Guangdong Pharmaceutical College” which offered undergraduate programmes in pharmacy. In March 2016, with the approval of Education Ministry, “Guangdong Pharmaceutical College”became "“Guangdong Pharmaceutical University”.By 2020, the university has five different campuses with three campuses located within Guangzhou metropolitan areas and the main campus is located at Guangzhou Mega Education Center.

References

External links 
Guangdong Pharmaceutical University 

Universities and colleges in Guangzhou
Guangzhou Higher Education Mega Center
Educational institutions established in 1958
1958 establishments in China